Yang Fasen (born February 1971) is a Chinese politician, currently serving as vice chairman of Xinjiang, party secretary of Ürümqi and Hotan.

Biography
Yang was born in Gulang County, Gansu, in February 1971. He enlisted in the People's Liberation Army in December 1990, serving until March 1994. He joined the Communist Party of China in June 1993.

Yang studied briefly at the Party School in Aksu Prefecture before being assigned to Kumbash Township as an official in December 1994. He moved up the ranks to become party secretary in November 1999. After a short term as party secretary of Yiganqi Township, he was promoted to vice governor of Aksu Prefecture in September 2005, and then served as deputy party secretary between December 2008 and September 2010. In September 2010, he was appoint party secretary of Baicheng County. It would be his first job as "first-in-charge" of a county. After this office was terminated in July 2014, he became party secretary of Kuqa County, serving until December 2016. He became deputy secretary of Hotan in December 2016, and then party secretary, the top political position in the prefecture, beginning in February 2018. He concurrently serves as vice chairman of Xinjiang since March 2021. On October 21, he was unanimously chosen as party secretary of Ürümqi, the capital of Xinjiang, becoming the youngest man to hold the position of top official in a provincial capital. He was also admitted to member of the standing committee of the CPC Xinjiang Regional Committee, the region's top authority.

Honours and awards 
 June 2015 Title of National Excellent Party Secretary in a County

References

1971 births
Living people
People from Gulang County
People's Republic of China politicians from Xinjiang
Chinese Communist Party politicians from Xinjiang